György Gurics (27 January 1929 – 10 September 2013) was a Hungarian wrestler. He was born in Dunapentele in Fejér County. He was Olympic bronze medalist in Freestyle wrestling from 1952. He won a gold medal in Greco-Roman Wrestling at the 1961 World Wrestling Championships. He was named Hungarian Sportsman of The Year in 1961.

References

External links
 

1929 births
2013 deaths
Sportspeople from Fejér County
Olympic wrestlers of Hungary
Wrestlers at the 1952 Summer Olympics
Wrestlers at the 1956 Summer Olympics
Wrestlers at the 1960 Summer Olympics
Hungarian male sport wrestlers
Olympic bronze medalists for Hungary
Olympic medalists in wrestling
Medalists at the 1952 Summer Olympics
20th-century Hungarian people